FJ may refer to:

Places 
 Fiji (ISO 3166-1 alpha-2 country code)
 .fj, the country code top level domain (ccTLD) for Fiji
 Fijian language (ISO 639-1 language code)
 Fujian, a province of China

Vehicles 
 FJ Fury, an early Cold War fighter aircraft of the US Navy
 Flying Junior, a sailing dinghy
 Holden FJ, an Australian car
 Jeep FJ, a compact delivery van
 Toyota FJ Cruiser, a sport utility vehicle
 Yamaha FJ, motorcycle

Science and mathematics 
 The FASEB Journal, a scientific journal of experimental biosciences
 Femtojoule (fJ), an SI unit of energy equal to 10−15 joules
 Fritz John conditions, conditions in optimization problems

Media 
 FictionJunction, a J-pop group
 The FJ Holden, an Australian film

Military 
 , German paratroopers
 , a military rank of the Bundeswehr
 FJ ABM , an anti-ballistic missile
 Young Force, the former youth wing of the Fuerza Nueva
 Youth Front, a Spanish terrorist organization

Aviation 
 Fiji Airways (IATA code)
 Williams FJ33 and FJ44, families of turbofan jet engines

Other uses 
 FJ Management, an American corporation
 FJ Reitz High School, a public high school in Evansville, Indiana
 Formula Junior, an auto racing class
 Sony Vaio FJ, a mid-2000s series of laptops

See also
 FJD (disambiguation)
 FJS (disambiguation)